Paul Tissandier (19 February 1881 – 11 March 1945) was a French aviator.

Biography

Tissandier was the son of aviator Gaston Tissandier and nephew of Albert Tissandier, Gaston's brother.

Tissandier began his flying career as a hot air balloon pilot and later moved to airships and finally to airplanes. He was a pilot-pupil of Wilbur Wright. Together with Count Charles de Lambert, he was involved in the construction of hydro-gliders.

The Aero Club Paul Tissandier based at the Saint-Cyr-l'École airfield was named in his honour.

Paul Tissandier Diploma
The Paul Tissandier Diploma is a perpetual international award established in 1952 by the Fédération Aéronautique Internationale in memory of Tissandier who was Treasurer of the FAI from its foundation to 1919 and its Secretary General from 1913 to 1945. The diplomas are awarded to those persons who have served the cause of aviation and private and sporting aviation in particular, by their work, initiative, devotion or other endeavours.

Each Aero club which is a member of FAI may recommend a number of deserving candidates for the diploma each year; the U.S. is allowed three. The recipients are confirmed by the FAI Administrative Council and publicly announced and the Diplomas are awarded at the annual FAI General Conference.

Notable recipients include:

Alessandro Bianchi – Italian Minister for Transportation
Ivo Boscarol – Slovenian producer of ultralight and light aircraft
Walter J. Boyne – US Air Force combat veteran
Lynn Garrison – Canadian aviator and mercenary
Nick Goodhart – British world gliding champion, record breaker and engineer
Jerzy Makula – Polish world glider champion
Yves Rousseau – French aviation pioneer
Kathy Sutton – Canadian world sky diving champion
Roger Poncelet – a third-generation Belgian wooden aeroplane and propeller manufacturer
Dr. Nabil Baz – Egyptian aviator who won the award for his contribution to aviation and air sports in Egypt
Svetlana Kapanina – a Russian aerobatic pilot
 Stewart Wood – President of the Experimental Aircraft Association of South Africa, 1992–2002
Madeleine O'Rourke – an Irish aviator, aviation educator, and organiser of air shows in Ireland
 – a Bulgarian colonel-general, athlete and deputy minister of defence of Bulgaria, 1960–1972

References

External links
 

1881 births
1945 deaths
French aviators